The 2023 Asian Water Polo Championship will be held from 22 to 27 March 2023 in Singapore. It will be the Asian continental qualification for the 2023 FINA Men's Water Polo World Cup.

Men's tournament

Preliminary round

Group A

Group B

Women's tournament

References

Asian Water Polo Championship
International water polo competitions hosted by Thailand
Asian Water Polo Championship
Asian Water Polo Championship